John Wright (sometimes known as Mr. Right) (born February 23, 1962) is a Canadian musician and songwriter.

Biography
Wright is best known as the drummer, keyboardist, occasional vocalist and co-songwriter in the progressive punk rock/punk jazz band NoMeansNo, as well as the lead singer and co-songwriter of the pop-punk group The Hanson Brothers. Both groups also feature Wright's older brother Rob and guitarist Tom Holliston. He has also performed in noted Canadian punk groups DOA, the Showbusiness Giants, and the Infamous Scientists. He is currently the songwriter and "musical director" for Compressorhead, a collaboration with Berlin-based artist Frank Barnes consisting of a "band" of robots that play real instruments.

Wright's distinct style of drumming utilizes traditional grip, an uncommon method for hard rock drummers, and fuses jazz, rock and punk techniques. His playing has been cited as an influence by several noted drummers, including Dave Grohl of Nirvana and the Foo Fighters, Tre Cool of Green Day, and Tim Solyan of Victims Family and Plaid Retina. Nomeansno further emphasized the drumming in the live environment by positioning the drum kit not near the back of the stage as is more common, but rather near the front of the stage so that the audience may see a side view of the drummer. Wright confirmed that this arrangement was intentional:

An avid homebrewer of beer, he has filmed and released an instructional video detailing his recommended brewing process. This video is currently available on DVD packaged with the live Hanson Brothers record It's A Living. Wright co-owns a craft beer pub in Powell River, British Columbia.

Wright is the father of two sons.

References

External links
 NoMeansNo website & message board

1962 births
Living people
Canadian punk rock drummers
Canadian male drummers
Canadian rock musicians
Musicians from Victoria, British Columbia
D.O.A. (band) members
Nomeansno members
The Hanson Brothers (band) members